The men's 100 yards event at the 1938 British Empire Games was held on 5 February at the Sydney Cricket Ground in Sydney, Australia.

Medalists

Results

Heats

Qualification: First 3 in each heat (Q) qualify directly for the semifinals.

Semifinals
Qualification: First 3 in each heat (Q) qualify directly for the final.

Final

References

Athletics at the 1938 British Empire Games
1938